Baseonema is a genus of flowering plants belonging to the family Apocynaceae.

Its native range is Eastern Tropical Africa.

Species:

Baseonema gregorii

References

Apocynaceae
Apocynaceae genera